Poonam Dasgupta is an Indian actress. She is known for her roles in Bollywood films. She has also acted in Hindi television serials and in plays. After retiring from the film industry, she made a comeback with the play Begum Sahiba co-starring Rahul Roy. She has acted in series of Zee Horror Show episodes between 1993 and 1999.

Filmography

Television

References

External links

Living people
Indian film actresses
Actresses in Malayalam cinema
20th-century Indian actresses
21st-century Indian actresses
Actresses in Hindi cinema
Actresses in Bengali cinema
Actresses in Kannada cinema
Actresses in Tamil cinema
Year of birth missing (living people)